Passion: Hymns Ancient and Modern is a 2004 live album recorded at Passion in 2003.

Track listing

Reception 
Andree Farias, writing for Christianity Today, gave the album 3.5 out of 5 stars, writing that it "[adds] a new twist to the lyrically and theologically starved modern worship scene," and calling it "one of the more enjoyable and worshipful Passion projects."

Personnel 
 Passion Worship Band
 David Crowder Band
 Matt Redman
 Chris Tomlin
 Christy Nockels
 Charlie Hall

References 

Passion Conferences albums
2004 live albums